Liepāja Nicolai Gymnasium was a six-year (later seven) gymnasium (high school) in Liepāja (Libau), Courland Governorate, Russian Empire.

It was established in 1865 on the basis of a school that traced its roots to 1848.  The school was named in honor of Nicholas Alexandrovich, Tsesarevich of Russia. The school building was constructed in 1883–1885 by architect Paul Max Bertschy. The school was diverse in students' religious and ethnic background. For example, in 1884, out of 398 pupils, 161 were Evangelical Lutherans (41.2%), 130 Jews (33.3%), 76 Catholics (19.4%) and 22 Eastern Orthodoxs (5.6%). The curriculum devoted substantial attention to the Latin and Greek languages. The language of instruction was switched from German to Russian in 1887.

The school continued to function until its evacuation to Petrograd during World War I (1915).

Principals
School principals were:

Karl Lessevs (Carl Lessew, 1865–1869)
Nikolai Lenstrēms (Nicolai Lenström, 1870–1883) 
Albert Volgemuts (Albert Wohlgemuth, 1883–1905)
Nicolai Papilov (1905–1908)

Prominent students
Many prominent Latvian, Lithuanian, Polish, and German people studied at the gymnasium, including:
Leonas Bistras, Prime Minister of Lithuania
Balys Dvarionas, Lithuanian composer
Oswald Külpe, German psychologist
Gabriel Narutowicz, President of Poland
Stanisław Narutowicz, Signatory of the Act of Independence of Lithuania
Issai Schur, Jewish mathematician
Salomėja Stakauskaitė, one of the first group of women parliamentarians in Lithuania
Konstanty Skirmunt, Polish diplomat and Minister of Foreign Affairs
Aleksandras Stulginskis, President of Lithuania
Juozas Tūbelis, Prime Minister of Lithuania
Antanas Vienuolis, Lithuanian writer
Max Weinreich, Jewish linguist

References

Liepāja
Schools in Latvia
Educational institutions established in 1865
1865 establishments in the Russian Empire
Educational institutions disestablished in 1915